Camilla Kolchinsky (25.12.1937 – 16.02.2016) (Russian: Камилла Кольчинская) was a Jewish conductor who was born in Russia. She was born in Moscow and made her debut as a conductor in Leningrad, now is known as St. Petersburg, while still a student. In 1976 she emigrated to Israel. She had conducted performances of the Polish National Radio Symphony Orchestra and  the Israel Philharmonic Orchestra and according to Gramophone was "one of the few Russian women to have made a successful international career as a conductor." At the time of her death she was the emeritus director of the El Camino Youth Orchestra.

Recordings
Glazunov/Dvorák Violin Concertos – Ilya Kaler (violin), Polish National Radio Symphony Orchestra, Camilla Kolchinsky (conductor). Label: Naxos

References

External links
 
 http://www.camillakolchinsky.com/en.html

1931 births
2016 deaths
Musicians from Moscow
Russian conductors (music)
Soviet emigrants to Israel
Soviet women musicians
Women conductors (music)